The 2021 Platzmann-Sauerland Open was a professional tennis tournament played on clay courts. It was the first edition of the tournament which was part of the 2021 ATP Challenger Tour. It took place in Lüdenscheid, Germany, between 16 and 22 August 2021.

Singles main draw entrants

Seeds

 1 Rankings as of 9 August 2021.

Other entrants
The following players received wildcards into the singles main draw:
  Shintaro Mochizuki
  Rudolf Molleker
  Marvin Möller

The following player received entry into the singles main draw using a protected ranking:
  Julien Cagnina

The following players received entry into the singles main draw as alternates:
  Nicolás Kicker
  Jelle Sels

The following players received entry from the qualifying draw:
  Javier Barranco Cosano
  Filip Jianu
  Matteo Martineau
  Genaro Alberto Olivieri

Champions

Singles 

  Daniel Altmaier def.  Nicolás Jarry 7–6(7–1), 4–6, 6–3.

Doubles 

  Ivan Sabanov /  Matej Sabanov def.  Denys Molchanov /  Aleksandr Nedovyesov 6–4, 2–6, [12–10].

References

Platzmann-Sauerland Open
Platzmann-Sauerland Open
August 2021 sports events in Germany